A rythe, or rithe, is a small stream, or a creek or inlet from a salt water harbour. The term is in common usage in the South of England. 

Examples include:
 The Rythe, a small river in Surrey
 Mengham Rythe, Hayling Island, Hampshire
 Mill Rythe, Hayling Island, Hampshire

References

Water streams